José Miguel Organista Simões Aguiar (born 4 February 1981), known as Miguelito, is a Portuguese former footballer. A speedy player, he could operate as defender or midfielder on the left side of the pitch.

He amassed Primeira Liga totals of 220 games and seven goals over the course of ten seasons, representing in the competition  Rio Ave, Nacional, Benfica, Braga, Marítimo, Belenenses and Vitória de Setúbal. He also competed professionally in Cyprus, in a 17-year career.

Club career
Born in Póvoa de Varzim, Miguelito joined neighbouring Rio Ave FC's youth system at the age of 10. He broke into the first team eight years later, contributing 26 games in the 2002–03 campaign as the club returned to the Primeira Liga after a three-year absence, as champions.

Transferred to Madeira's C.D. Nacional in summer 2005, Miguelito went on to be considered of one of the best left wingers in the Portuguese top division. After an impressive season, in which he did not miss one match as the Madeira side qualified to the UEFA Cup (notably scoring against his former team in a 2–0 away win), he was bought by S.L. Benfica on 22 August 2006, having previously been voted the league's best defender by newspaper Record.

Midway through 2007–08, after having managed just three appearances in the Portuguese League Cup, barred by former Brazilian international Léo, Miguelito joined S.C. Braga in January, on loan. In August, he was released by Benfica and signed a three-year contract with C.S. Marítimo, which had just qualified to the UEFA Cup.

After a good first season, Miguelito fell out of favour and was inclusively demoted to the reserves. In late January 2010, he moved on loan to C.F. Os Belenenses.

Personal life
Miguelito's younger brother, Sérgio Organista, was also a footballer. A youth product of FC Porto, he went on to represent, among others, Pontevedra CF.

Honours
Rio Ave
Segunda Liga: 2002–03

Moreirense
Segunda Liga: 2013–14

References

External links

1981 births
Living people
People from Póvoa de Varzim
Sportspeople from Porto District
Portuguese footballers
Association football defenders
Association football midfielders
Primeira Liga players
Liga Portugal 2 players
Segunda Divisão players
Rio Ave F.C. players
C.D. Nacional players
S.L. Benfica footballers
S.C. Braga players
C.S. Marítimo players
C.F. Os Belenenses players
Vitória F.C. players
Moreirense F.C. players
G.D. Chaves players
F.C. Tirsense players
Cypriot First Division players
Apollon Limassol FC players
Portugal youth international footballers
Portugal under-21 international footballers
Portuguese expatriate footballers
Expatriate footballers in Cyprus
Portuguese expatriate sportspeople in Cyprus